Karjalainen ("Karelian") is a Finnish surname. Notable people with the surname include:

Ahti Karjalainen (1907–1986), Finnish composer
Ahti Karjalainen (1923–1990), Finnish politician and former prime minister
Anniina Karjalainen, Finnish singer
Elina Karjalainen (1927–2006), Finnish journalist and author
Hanna Karjalainen (b. 1980), Finnish actress
Henri Karjalainen (b. 1986), Finnish racing driver
Jari Karjalainen (b. 1967), Finnish singer
Jouko Karjalainen (b. 1956), Finnish skier
J. (Jukka) Karjalainen (b. 1957), Finnish singer
Kastehelmi Karjalainen (1911–1973), Finnish artist
Kimmo Karjalainen, Finnish musician
Kristina Karjalainen, Estonian-Finnish model and Miss Estonia 2013
Kustaa Fredrik Karjalainen (1871–1919), Finnish linguist and explorer
Kyösti Karjalainen, a Swedish ice hockey player (of Finnish descent) for Los Angeles Kings
Lasse Karjalainen (b. 1974), Finnish footballer
Markku Karjalainen (b. 1966), Finnish wheelchair curler
Olli-Pekka Karjalainen (b. 1980), Finnish hammer thrower
Pekka Karjalainen, Finnish film director and sound producer
Petra Karjalainen (b. 1969), Finnish actress
Sampo Karjalainen (b. 1977), one of the founders of Habbo Hotel
Sari Karjalainen (b. 1968), Finnish wheelchair curler and Paralympian
Tapio Karjalainen (b. 1939), Finnish politician
Toni Karjalainen (b. 1979), Finnish golfer

Finnish-language surnames